The Dark Won't Hide You is the debut release by Los Angeles-based rock band Night Horse.  It was recorded in Mathias Schneeberger's "Donner & Blitzen" studio in Arcadia, California.

The artwork was created by the members of the band.

The song "Heart and Soul" was made available as a bonus track for online download through digital retailers like iTunes and Amazon.com.  The vinyl LP version of the album also includes a "dropcard" enabling purchasers to download the album, including the bonus track, for free.

Track listing 
 "Don't Need Your Lovin'" - 6:24
 "The Dark Won't Hide You" - 4:47
 "Wicked Love" - 5:19
 "Shine On Me" - 5:35
 "Worried Life Blues" - 4:23
 "For You (Greg's Lament)" - 6:29

Online bonus track
 "Heart and Soul" - 4:03

2008 albums
Night Horse albums
Tee Pee Records albums